Munte may refer to:

 Munte (Belgium), part of the Belgian municipality of Merelbeke
 Munte (Karo Regency), an [Indonesian district of the regency of Karo (North Sumatra)
 Munte (Netherlands), a river located in the province of Groningen; see List of rivers of the Netherlands